The Tūranganui River is a river in the Wellington Region of New Zealand. It flows through the south Wairarapa from its source in the Aorangi Range to reach the Ruamahanga River shortly before the latter's outflow into Palliser Bay.

In December 2019, the approved official geographic name of the river was gazetted as "Tūranganui River".

References

Rivers of the Wellington Region
Rivers of New Zealand